The College of Montana was a private liberal arts college that existed in Deer Lodge, Montana in the late 19th and early 20th centuries.  Founded in 1878 as the "Montana Collegiate Institute", the school was the first institution of higher learning in Montana.  The College of Montana name was adopted in 1883.  For much of its existence, the college was affiliated with the Presbyterian Church.

Strapped for funding and suffering from a limited enrollment, the school had an erratic existence and finally closed for good in 1916.  Seven years later, the organization of the College of Montana merged with that of Montana Wesleyan College to form Intermountain Union College, located in Helena, Montana.  Intermountain Union, in turn, later merged with the Billings Polytechnic Institute to form Rocky Mountain College.

Probably the best-known person once associated with the College of Montana was the literary critic Irving Babbitt, who taught at the school for a time. Theodore M. Brantley, later Chief Justice of the Montana Supreme Court, taught at the college for several years. Augustus M. Ryon founded the college's School of Mines in 1888, and was named the first president of Montana State University in 1893. James R. Reid, who served as the college's president from 1891 to 1893, became the second president of Montana State University.

Buildings from the former College of Montana campus still survive in Deer Lodge, including Trask Hall, which is listed on the National Register of Historic Places.

References

Defunct private universities and colleges in Montana
University and college buildings on the National Register of Historic Places in Montana
Educational institutions established in 1878
Rocky Mountain College
1878 establishments in Montana Territory
National Register of Historic Places in Powell County, Montana
Presbyterian universities and colleges in the United States